Ion Television is an American broadcast, cable and satellite television network owned by the Katz Broadcasting subsidiary of the E. W. Scripps Company, which was launched on August 31, 1998 as Pax TV. , the network currently has 59 owned-and-operated stations, and current and pending affiliation agreements with 15 other television stations. Most of its owned-and-operated stations incorporate the letters "PX" in their call signs (in reference to the original name of the network, itself derived in part from its corporate parent's former name until 2007, Paxson Communications), and all but one carry the network as a primary channel affiliation. Ion also distributes its base national programming feed directly to cable, satellite and IPTV providers, along with smart TVs and streaming services in various media markets not listed here, as an alternative method of distribution in areas without a locally based owned-and-operated or affiliate station.

This article is a listing of current, pending and former Ion affiliates in the United States (including subchannel affiliates, satellite stations and select low-power translators), arranged alphabetically by state, and based on the station's city of license and followed in parentheses by the Designated Market Area if it differs from the city of license. There are links to and articles on each of the broadcast stations, describing their histories, technical information (such as broadcast frequencies) and any local programming.

The station's virtual (PSIP) channel number follows the call letters, and is itself followed by the station's actual digital channel number, which are listed as separate columns. The article also includes a list of its former affiliate stations, which is based strictly on the station's city of license or market, and denotes the years in which the station served as an affiliate under either its Pax TV, i: Independent Television and/or Ion Television identities as well as the current status of the corresponding channel that carried the network.

Current affiliates
Notes:
 Two boldface asterisks appearing following a station's call letters (**) indicate a station that was an original Ion Television owned-and-operated station from the network's inception as Pax TV in August 1998.
 This list includes Ion Media Networks-owned stations, which are also listed separately from its affiliated stations in the article List of stations owned and operated by Ion Media Networks.

Former affiliates

References

External links
 

 
Ion Television